Thomas Assheton Smith (the elder) (1752 – 12 May 1828) was an English landowner and all-round sportsman who played a major part in the development of the Welsh slate industry.

Life 
Smith was the eldest son of Thomas Assheton of Ashley, Mobberley in Cheshire, who had added "Smith" to his surname when he inherited the Vaynol (Caernarvonshire) and Tidworth (then in Hampshire) estates from his uncle, William Smith.

He was High Sheriff of Caernarfonshire for 1774–75 and 1783–84 and High Sheriff of Anglesey for 1784–85. He was Member of Parliament for Caernarvonshire from 1774 to 1780 and also MP for the English borough of Andover, Hampshire between 1797 and 1821. He served as Lord Lieutenant of Caernarvonshire from 1822 until his death.

In 1806 he induced Parliament to pass an act enclosing the common land of Llanddeiniolen parish, adding over 2,600 acres to his land holdings, and giving him the right as lord of the manor to the slate on the commons. He put down the rioting which resisted exercise of his new rights of control over the commons with the support of a cavalry unit. In 1809 he took over control of slate quarrying on his estate, forming a company of four under his presidency. The company was later dissolved and he took over sole control of the enterprise. By 1826 the Dinorwic Quarry was employing 800 men and producing 20,000 tons of slate per year. Assheton Smith developed Port Dinorwic (Y Felinheli) as a port for the export of the slates.

Cricket
Thomas Assheton Smith was a keen sportsman and was particularly noted for his involvement in cricket.  He was a close friend of George Finch, 9th Earl of Winchilsea and became one of cricket's main patrons following the establishment of Marylebone Cricket Club (MCC) in 1787.  Smith was not a good player, unlike his son, but is known to have taken part in 45 major matches between the 1787 and 1796 seasons.  In the contemporary scorecards, he is generally shown as "A Smith, Esq." whereas his son was usually recorded as "T A Smith, Esq.".

Family and death
Assheton Smith married Elizabeth Wynn, daughter of Watkin Wynn of Foelas. His eldest son, John, was expelled from the family after marrying a servant, and was subsequently wiped from their family records. Assheton Smith's third son, William, saw action at Trafalgar on  but drowned in 1806. There were also five daughters.

He died at Tidworth in 1828, and the Tidworth and Vaynol estates were inherited by his namesake second son, Thomas Assheton Smith (1776–1858), who was also a noted amateur cricketer and all-round sportsman.

References

 Jones, E. G., (1959). SMITH, THOMAS ASSHETON (1752-1828), of Vaenol Bangor landed proprietor and quarry owner. Dictionary of Welsh Biography. Retrieved 15 Dec 2020, from 
 Scores & Biographies by Arthur Haygarth

External links
 CricketArchive

|-

|-

|-

1752 births
1828 deaths
People from Mobberley
Members of the Parliament of Great Britain for Welsh constituencies
British MPs 1774–1780
Members of the Parliament of Great Britain for English constituencies
British MPs 1796–1800
Members of the Parliament of the United Kingdom for English constituencies
UK MPs 1801–1802
UK MPs 1802–1806
UK MPs 1806–1807
UK MPs 1807–1812
UK MPs 1812–1818
UK MPs 1818–1820
UK MPs 1820–1826
19th-century English businesspeople
British mining businesspeople
English cricketers
English cricketers of 1787 to 1825
History of Gwynedd
Marylebone Cricket Club cricketers
Slate industry in Wales
Hampshire cricketers
18th-century English landowners
White Conduit Club cricketers
High Sheriffs of Caernarvonshire
High Sheriffs of Anglesey
Lord-Lieutenants of Caernarvonshire
Old Etonians cricketers
Non-international England cricketers
Sportspeople from Cheshire
Cricket patrons
19th-century English landowners